This is a list of the mammal species recorded in South Georgia and the South Sandwich Islands. There are thirteen mammal species in South Georgia and the South Sandwich Islands, of which one is endangered.

The following tags are used to highlight each species' conservation status as assessed by the International Union for Conservation of Nature:

Order: Cetacea (whales) 

The order Cetacea includes whales, dolphins and porpoises. They are the mammals most fully adapted to aquatic life with a spindle-shaped nearly hairless body, protected by a thick layer of blubber, and forelimbs and tail modified to provide propulsion underwater.

Suborder: Mysticeti
Family: Balaenidae
Genus: Eubalaena
 Southern right whale, Eubalaena australis LR/cd (Still rarer in these regions)
Family: Balaenopteridae
Subfamily: Balaenopterinae
Genus: Balaenoptera
 Antarctic minke whale, Balaenoptera bonaerensis DD
 Southern sei whale, Balaenoptera borealis schlegelii EN
 Southern fin whale, Balaenoptera physalus quoyi EN
 Southern blue whale, Balaenoptera musculus intermedia EN
Subfamily: Megapterinae
Genus: Megaptera
 Humpback whale, Megaptera novaeangliae VU
Suborder: Odontoceti
Superfamily: Platanistoidea
Family: Phocoenidae
Genus: Phocoena
 Spectacled porpoise, Phocoena dioptrica DD
Family: Ziphidae
Genus: Berardius
 Giant beaked whale, Berardius arnuxii LR/cd
Subfamily: Hyperoodontinae
Genus: Mesoplodon
 Gray's beaked whale, Mesoplodon grayi DD
Family: Delphinidae (marine dolphins)
Genus: Cephalorhynchus
 Commerson dolphin, Cephalorhynchus commersonii DD
Genus: Lagenorhynchus
 Hourglass dolphin, Lagenorhynchus cruciger LR/lc
 Peale's dolphin, Lagenorhynchus australis DD
Genus: Globicephala
 Long-finned pilot whale, Globicephala melas DD
Genus: Orcinus
 Orca, Orcinus orca LR/cd

Order: Carnivora (carnivorans) 

There are over 260 species of carnivorans, the majority of which feed primarily on meat. They have a characteristic skull shape and dentition. 
Suborder: Caniformia
Family: Otariidae (eared seals, sealions)
Genus: Arctophoca
 South American fur seal, Arctophoca australis LR/lc
 Antarctic fur seal, Arctophoca gazella LR/lc
 Subantarctic fur seal, Arctophoca tropicalis LR/lc
Family: Phocidae (earless seals)
Genus: Hydrurga
 Leopard seal, H. leptonyx LR/lc
Genus: Leptonychotes
 Weddell seal, Leptonychotes weddellii LR/lc
Genus: Lobodon
 Crabeater seal, Lobodon carcinophaga LR/lc
Genus: Mirounga
 Southern elephant seal, M. leonina

Order: Artiodactyla (even-toed ungulates) 
The even-toed ungulates are ungulates whose weight is borne about equally by the third and fourth toes, rather than mostly or entirely by the third as in perissodactyls. There are about 220 artiodactyl species, including many that are of great economic importance to humans.

Family: Cervidae (deer)
Subfamily: Capreolinae
Genus: Rangifer
Reindeer, R. tarandus  introduced, extirpated

See also
List of chordate orders
Lists of mammals by region
List of prehistoric mammals
Mammal classification
List of mammals described in the 2000s

Notes

References
 

'mammals
mammals
South Georgia and the South Sandwich Islands
South Georgia and the South Sandwich Islands